Trollope & Colls was once one of the United Kingdom's largest construction companies.

History
The Company was formed in 1903, out of the merger of George Trollope & Sons (founded by Joseph Trollope, a wallpaper hanger, in 1778) and Colls & Sons (founded by Benjamin Colls, a painter and decorator, in 1840).

The merged firm started to specialise in civil engineering and during the First World War undertook pioneering work on reinforced concrete. In 1969 the Company was acquired by Trafalgar House. By 1994 it was the largest contractor in the United Kingdom by turnover.

On 18 April 1996 Norwegian shipbuilding and engineering group Kvaerner acquired Trafalgar House Construction, as the business became known, as part of a £904 million offer for Trafalgar House plc.

Major projects
Projects undertaken by the company and its predecessors included: Her Majesty's Theatre completed in 1869, St Philip's Church, Battersea completed in 1870, the Institute of Chartered Accountants completed in 1892, Claridge's completed in 1897, the Baltic Exchange completed in 1903, the Debenhams Headquarters in Wigmore Street completed in 1908, Lloyds Bank in Lombard Street completed in 1931, the Ministry of Defence Main Building completed in 1959, Trawsfynndd power station completed in 1962, Hull Royal Infirmary completed in 1965, Northwick Park Hospital completed in 1970 and the Stock Exchange Tower completed in 1972.

References

Further reading
Trollope & Colls, City builders for 200 years 1778-1978, Published in 1978, Printed by Precision Press for Trollope & Colls, Marlow, Buckinghamshire

External links
British Film Institute

Construction and civil engineering companies of the United Kingdom
Companies based in Buckinghamshire
British companies established in 1903
Construction and civil engineering companies established in 1903
Consulting firms established in 1903
1903 establishments in England
1996 disestablishments in England
Defunct construction and civil engineering companies
British companies disestablished in 1996
Construction and civil engineering companies disestablished in the 20th century